was a private junior college in Nagano, Nagano, Japan, established in 1967. It closed down in 2009.

External links
 Official website 

Educational institutions established in 1967
Private universities and colleges in Japan
Universities and colleges in Nagano Prefecture
College Economics
Japanese junior colleges